Jimmie Ernesto Rivera (born June 29, 1989) is an American professional mixed martial artist and bare-knuckle boxer, currently signed to Bare Knuckle Fighting Championship (BKFC). Prior to signing with BKFC, Rivera competed in the UFC's Bantamweight division, and achieved status as a top 5 UFC bantamweight contender. Rivera has formerly competed for Bellator, the World Series of Fighting, CFFC and King of the Cage, where he was the KOTC Bantamweight Champion.

Background
A native of Ramsey, New Jersey, Rivera was a former Ramsey High School wrestler.

Mixed martial arts career

Early career
A Tiger Schulmann MMA product, Jimmie Rivera started his career in 2007 when he was 18 years old. After compiling an undefeated 7–0 record as an amateur within only two years, he moved to professional mixed martial arts.

As a professional, he fought only for New Jersey's promotion Ring of Combat before signing with Bellator in 2009.

Bellator Fighting Championships
Rivera made his debut on April 10, 2009, at Bellator 2 against Willie Gates. Rivera won via submission in the third round.

Rivera faced Nick Garcia on June 12, 2009, at Bellator 11. He defeated Garcia via unanimous decision.

King of the Cage
Rivera faced Abel Cullum on September 17, 2010, for the KOTC flyweight title. Rivera won via split decision (49-46 Rivera, 49-46 Rivera, 48-47 Cullum) after five rounds and became the new champion.

Rivera made a title defense against Jared Papazian on February 3, 2011. After five rounds he won via unanimous decision and retained his belt.

The Ultimate Fighter
Rivera appeared in the first episode of The Ultimate Fighter: Team Bisping vs. Team Miller. He lost via TKO in the second round against Dennis Bermudez during the entry round.

Return to Ring of Combat
Rivera returned to ROC on June 15, 2012, against Justin Hickey for the bantamweight title. He won the title via unanimous decision (30-27, 30–27, 30–27) in a three-round match.

Rivera defended his belt once against Joel Roberts on September 14, 2012.

Rivera was expected to face Anthony Leone on November 18, 2011. It was rescheduled to happen on April 27, 2012, but for undisclosed reasons the fight was scrapped.

Second Bellator run
Rivera faced Jesse Brock on December 7, 2012, at Bellator 83. He won via unanimous decision (30-27, 30–27, 29–28).

Rivera faced Brian Kelleher on April 4, 2013, at Bellator 95. He won via unanimous decision (30-27, 29–28, 29–28).

World Series of Fighting
Rivera faced Sidemar Honório on September 14, 2013, at WSOF 5. He was able to come through after taking a significant amount of damage in the first round, and managed to recover in the second and third rounds using his strength and wrestling skills. Rivera won the fight via unanimous decision (30-27, 29–28, 29–28).

Ultimate Fighting Championship
Rivera made his promotional debut and faced Marcus Brimage on July 18, 2015, at UFC Fight Night 72, replacing an injured Ian Entwistle. He won the fight via KO in the first round.

Rivera faced Pedro Munhoz on November 7, 2015, at UFC Fight Night 77. He won the fight via split decision.

Rivera faced Iuri Alcântara on January 30, 2016, at UFC on Fox 18.  He won the fight by unanimous decision.  The win also earned Rivera his first Fight of the Night bonus award.

Rivera faced Urijah Faber on September 10, 2016, at UFC 203.  He won the fight by unanimous decision.

Rivera was expected to face Bryan Caraway on January 15, 2017, at UFC Fight Night 103. However, Caraway pulled out of the fight citing an injury, and Rivera rejected the replacement Marlon Vera due to the lack of rank and relevance in the division.

Rivera faced Thomas Almeida on July 22, 2017, at UFC on Fox 25. He won the fight by unanimous decision, extending his win streak to 20.

Rivera was expected to face Dominick Cruz on December 30, 2017, at UFC 219. However Cruz suffered a broken arm in training and had to pull out of the fight, and he was replaced by John Lineker. On December 24, Lineker pulled out of the fight citing a tooth infection. After a failed negotiation with Marlon Moraes in attempt to remain on the card, Rivera announced that he will not compete at the event.

Rivera faced Marlon Moraes on June 1, 2018, in the main event at UFC Fight Night 131. He lost the fight by knockout in the first round due to a head kick and punches. This marked the first time Rivera has been finished in his professional MMA career.

Rivera faced John Dodson on September 8, 2018, at UFC 228. He won the fight via unanimous decision.

Rivera faced Aljamain Sterling on February 17, 2019, at UFC on ESPN 1. He lost the fight by unanimous decision.

Rivera faced Petr Yan on June 8, 2019, at UFC 238. He lost the fight via unanimous decision.

Rivera was scheduled to face Marlon Vera on February 8, 2020, at UFC 247. However, Rivera pulled out of the fight on January 23 citing an injury. Promotion officials have not announced whether or not Vera would remain on the card against a replacement, or if the pairing with Rivera would remain intact and rescheduled for a future event.

Rivera faced Cody Stamann in a featherweight bout on July 16, 2020, at UFC on ESPN: Kattar vs. Ige. He won the fight via unanimous decision.

A rematch against Pedro Munhoz was scheduled on January 30, 2021, at UFC on ESPN 20.  On December 26, it was announced that the bout was moved to January 20, 2021, at UFC on ESPN 20. The pairing was rescheduled once again in early January as they were moved to UFC 258 on February 13, 2021, due to undisclosed reasons. During the week leading up to the event, the bout was delayed again due to a positive COVID-19 test for someone within the two camps. The pairing is expected to remain intact and is tentatively expected to take place two weeks later at UFC Fight Night: Rozenstruik vs. Gane. Rivera lost the fight via unanimous decision. This bout earned him a Fight of the Night bonus award 

In August 2021, it was reported that Rivera finished his fight contract from UFC and was removed from UFC rankings pool.

Bare-knuckle boxing
In November 2021, it was announced that Rivera had signed an exclusive contract with Bare Knuckle Fighting Championship. 

Rivera made his debut against Howard Davis on June 24, 2022 at Bare Knuckle Fighting Championship event. The back-and-forth bout ended in a majority draw.

Personal life 

It was announced that Rivera graduated from New Jersey police academy on late January 2023.

Championships and accomplishments

Mixed martial arts
 Ultimate Fighting Championship
 Fight of the Night (Two times) vs. Iuri Alcântara and Pedro Munhoz
 Cage Fury Fighting Championships
 CFFC Bantamweight Championship (One time)
 One successful title defense
 King of the Cage
 KOTC Flyweight (135 lb) Championship (One time)
 One successful title defense
 Ring of Combat
 ROC Bantamweight Championship (One time)
 One successful title defense

Mixed martial arts record

|-
|Loss
|align=center|23–5
|Pedro Munhoz
|Decision (unanimous)
|UFC Fight Night: Rozenstruik vs. Gane
|
|align=center|3
|align=center|5:00
|Las Vegas, Nevada, United States
|
|-
|Win
|align=center|23–4
|Cody Stamann
|Decision (unanimous)
|UFC on ESPN: Kattar vs. Ige
|
|align=center|3
|align=center|5:00
|Abu Dhabi, United Arab Emirates
|
|-
|Loss
|align=center|22–4
|Petr Yan
|Decision (unanimous)
|UFC 238
|
|align=center|3
|align=center|5:00
|Chicago, Illinois, United States
|
|-
|Loss
|align=center|22–3
|Aljamain Sterling
|Decision (unanimous)
|UFC on ESPN: Ngannou vs. Velasquez
|
|align=center|3
|align=center|5:00
|Phoenix, Arizona, United States
|
|-
|Win
|align=center|22–2
|John Dodson
|Decision (unanimous)
|UFC 228
|
|align=center|3
|align=center|5:00
|Dallas, Texas, United States
| 
|-
|Loss
|align=center|21–2
|Marlon Moraes
|KO (head kick and punches)
|UFC Fight Night: Rivera vs. Moraes
|
|align=center|1
|align=center|0:33
|Utica, New York, United States
|
|-
|Win
|align=center|21–1
|Thomas Almeida
|Decision (unanimous)
|UFC on Fox: Weidman vs. Gastelum
|
|align=center|3
|align=center|5:00
|Uniondale, New York, United States
|
|-
|Win
|align=center|20–1
|Urijah Faber
|Decision (unanimous)
|UFC 203
|
|align=center|3
|align=center|5:00
|Cleveland, Ohio, United States
| 
|-
|Win
|align=center|19–1
|Iuri Alcântara
|Decision (unanimous)
|UFC on Fox: Johnson vs. Bader
|
|align=center|3
|align=center|5:00
|Newark, New Jersey, United States
|
|-
| Win
| align=center| 18–1
| Pedro Munhoz
|  Decision (split)
| UFC Fight Night: Belfort vs. Henderson 3
| 
| align=center| 3
| align=center| 5:00
| São Paulo, Brazil
|
|-
| Win
| align=center| 17–1
| Marcus Brimage
| KO (punches)
| UFC Fight Night: Bisping vs. Leites
| 
| align=center| 1
| align=center| 1:29
| Glasgow, Scotland
|
|-
| Win
| align=center| 16–1
| Carson Beebe
| KO (punch)
| CFFC 48: Good vs. Burrell
| 
| align=center| 1
| align=center| 0:16
| Atlantic City, New Jersey, United States
| 
|-
| Win
| align=center| 15–1
| Anthony Durnell
| TKO (punch)
| CFFC 43: Webb vs. Good
| 
| align=center| 3
| align=center| 3:22
| Atlantic City, New Jersey, United States
| 
|-
| Win
| align=center| 14–1
| Cody Stevens
| Decision (unanimous)
| CFFC 35: Heckman vs. Makashvili
| 
| align=center| 3
| align=center| 5:00
| Atlantic City, New Jersey, United States
|
|-
| Win
| align=center| 13–1
| Sidemar Honório
| Decision (unanimous)
| WSOF 5
| 
| align=center| 3
| align=center| 5:00
| Atlantic City, New Jersey, United States
|
|-
| Win
| align=center| 12–1
| Brian Kelleher
| Decision (unanimous)
| Bellator 95
| 
| align=center| 3
| align=center| 5:00
| Atlantic City, New Jersey, United States
| 
|-
| Win
| align=center| 11–1
| Jesse Brock
| Decision (unanimous)
| Bellator 83
| 
| align=center| 3
| align=center| 5:00
| Atlantic City, New Jersey, United States
|
|-
| Win
| align=center| 10–1
| Joel Roberts
| Decision (unanimous)
| Ring of Combat 42
| 
| align=center| 3
| align=center| 5:00
| Atlantic City, New Jersey, United States
| 
|-
| Win
| align=center| 9–1
| Justin Hickey
| Decision (unanimous)
| Ring of Combat 41
| 
| align=center| 3
| align=center| 5:00
| Atlantic City, New Jersey, United States
| 
|-
| Win
| align=center| 8–1
| Jared Papazian
| Decision (unanimous)
| KOTC: Empire
| 
| align=center| 5
| align=center| 5:00
| San Bernardino, California, United States
| 
|-
| Win
| align=center| 7–1
| Abel Cullum
| Decision (split)
| KOTC: No Mercy
| 
| align=center| 5
| align=center| 5:00
| Mashantucket, Connecticut, United States
| 
|-
| Win
| align=center| 6–1
| Carlos David
| KO (punches)
| Ring of Combat 29
| 
| align=center| 2
| align=center| 2:59
| Atlantic City, New Jersey, United States
|
|-
| Win
| align=center| 5–1
| Claudio Ledesma
| Decision (unanimous)
| UCC 1: Merciless
| 
| align=center| 3
| align=center| 5:00
| Jersey City, New Jersey, United States
|
|-
| Win
| align=center| 4–1
| Nick Garcia
| Decision (unanimous)
| Bellator 11
| 
| align=center| 3
| align=center| 5:00
| Uncasville, Connecticut, United States
|
|-
| Win
| align=center| 3–1
| Willie Gates
| Submission (triangle choke)
| Bellator 2
| 
| align=center| 3
| align=center| 3:17
| Uncasville, Connecticut, United States
|
|-
| Win
| align=center| 2–1
| Tyler Venice
| Technical Submission (rear-naked choke)
| Ring of Combat 23
| 
| align=center| 2
| align=center| 1:13
| Atlantic City, New Jersey, United States
|
|-
| Loss
| align=center| 1–1
| Jason McLean
| Decision (split)
| Ring of Combat 22
| 
| align=center| 3
| align=center| 4:00
| Atlantic City, New Jersey, United States
|
|-
| Win
| align=center| 1–0
| Fernando Bernandino
| Decision (unanimous)
| Ring of Combat 21
| 
| align=center| 2
| align=center| 4:00
| Atlantic City, New Jersey, United States
|

Mixed martial arts exhibition record

| Loss
| align=center| 0–1
| Dennis Bermudez
| TKO (punches)
| The Ultimate Fighter: Team Bisping vs. Team Miller
|  (airdate)
| align=center| 2
| align=center| 1:40
| Las Vegas, Nevada, United States
|

Bare knuckle boxing record

|-
|Draw
|align=center|0–0–1
|Howard Davis
| draw(majority)
|BKFC 26: Hollywood
|
|align=center|5
|align=center|2:00
|Hollywood, Florida, United States
|

See also

 List of Bellator MMA alumni
 List of male mixed martial artists

References

External links
 
 

1989 births
Living people
Sportspeople from Bergen County, New Jersey
Sportspeople from Brooklyn
People from Ramsey, New Jersey
Ramsey High School (New Jersey) alumni
Mixed martial artists from New York (state)
Mixed martial artists utilizing Kyokushin kaikan
American sportspeople of Puerto Rican descent
Bantamweight mixed martial artists
Featherweight mixed martial artists
American male karateka
Ultimate Fighting Championship male fighters